The Yalta Memorial Garden (or the Cromwell Gardens Triangle or Thurloe Place Gardens) is a small triangular garden in South Kensington, west London, SW7. The garden contains Twelve Responses to Tragedy (or the Yalta Memorial), a memorial located that commemorates people displaced as a result of the Yalta Conference at the conclusion of World War II. The memorial was dedicated in 1986 to replace a previous memorial dedicated in 1982 that had been repeatedly damaged by vandalism.

The land on which the garden is situated was first described in 1928 when it was part of the Crown Estate by the Report of the Royal Commission on London Squares as a 'grass plot with a few trees'.

The garden is located at the junction of Cromwell Gardens, Thurloe Place and is adjacent to the private Thurloe Square. The Victoria & Albert Museum is immediately north of the garden, on the opposite side of Cromwell Gardens. The museum maintains the garden. The garden and memorial are publicly accessible at all times.

Design
The plot of the garden is triangular, a central paved path leads to the apex of the triangle, the path is lined by ornamental trees, and a hedge forms a border around the garden. The far west of the garden contains a flower bed.

References

1986 in London
1986 establishments in England
Gardens in London
Parks and open spaces in the Royal Borough of Kensington and Chelsea
South Kensington